The San Antonio Scorpions were an American professional soccer team based in San Antonio, Texas. Founded in 2010, the team made its debut in the North American Soccer League in 2012. The Scorpions played at Toyota Field, a soccer specific stadium that was completed in 2013.

The club operated differently from most professional sports clubs in terms of its operating profit. As part of owner Gordon Hartman's Soccer for a Cause, all net profits from Scorpions operations went towards funding Morgan's Wonderland, a wheelchair accessible theme park located in the Longhorn Quarry, next to STAR Soccer Complex and Toyota Field.

On December 22, 2015, it was announced that Toyota Field and S.T.A.R. Soccer Complex were sold to the City of San Antonio and Bexar County, a deal which was accompanied by an agreement for Spurs Sports and Entertainment to operate the facilities and field San Antonio FC, which plays in the USL.

History

NASL expansion 

On October 4, 2010, the NASL announced that a San Antonio expansion team would join the new league in 2012. The team's ownership group was led by San Antonio businessman and philanthropist Gordon Hartman. The official name of the team was revealed at a press conference on January 10, 2011: San Antonio Scorpions FC.

In the team's first NASL game, the Scorpions tied the Atlanta Silverbacks 0–0. Despite Heroes Stadium's listed capacity of 11,000, the Scorpions drew 13,151 to their home opener against the Puerto Rico Islanders on April 15, 2012. The Scorpions lost the game 4–0.

The Scorpions scored their first goal the following weekend in a 2–2 tie with the Fort Lauderdale Strikers, with Pablo Campos netting the first goal in the 41st minute. Hans Denissen scored in stoppage time to give San Antonio its first ever home points.

The Scorpions sold 3,040 season tickets for the 2013 season. After a promising spring season in which the team finished 3rd, the fall season told another story. On August 27, 2013, Tim Hankinson was fired as Head Coach after an 0–0–4 start in the NASL fall season. Assistant Coach Alen Marcina was named to replace him on an interim basis. Marcina was named permanent head coach on November 20, 2013. The Scorpions would finish last in the fall season standings and finish in 7th place in the combined table at the end of the 2013 season.

NASL Soccer Bowl champions (2014) 

The 2014 season, Marcina's first full season at the helm, was a complete turnaround for the Scorpions from the previous year. After finishing third in the spring season standings, the Scorpions captured the fall season championship on a stoppage-time goal from captain Adrian Cann in a 1–0 win over the visiting New York Cosmos. The Scorpions would face the Cosmos again just a week later in their NASL Championship semi-final game at Toyota Field. The Scorpions would go on to win that game in extra-time, 2–1, as Wálter Restrepo scored the winning goal in the 110th minute.

On November 15, 2014, the Scorpions hosted the 2014 Soccer Bowl at Toyota Field against the Fort Lauderdale Strikers in front of a modern-era NASL Championship game record attendance of 7,847 fans. The Scorpions would go on to win their first NASL title beating the Strikers 2–1 in the Soccer Bowl. Rafael Castillo was named the Man of the Match after he opened up the scoring with a bicycle kick that garnered national attention.

Stadium 

 Heroes Stadium (2012), capacity 11,000
 Comalander Stadium (2012 U.S. Open Cup Round 2 vs Laredo Heat), capacity 11,000
 Toyota Field (2013–2015), capacity 8,000

While the club waited for Toyota Field to be constructed, the Scorpions used Heroes Stadium in San Antonio as their home for the 2012 season.

The Scorpions used Comalander Stadium as an alternate playing site for their 2012 U.S. Open Cup matchup against the Laredo Heat. Comalander Stadium is owned by North East ISD, the same owner of Heroes Stadium.

In 2013, the team debuted in Toyota Field, built across the street from the STAR Soccer Complex. Construction on Toyota Field began in February 2012 and was opened in April 2013. Toyota Field seats 8,000 fans, with the possibility of expanding the complex up to 18,000 as demand necessitates.

On November 15, 2014, Toyota Field hosted the NASL Soccer Bowl between the San Antonio Scorpions and the Fort Lauderdale Strikers. The Scorpions won 2–1.

Club culture

Supporters 

The Scorpions had three supporters groups:

 The largest organized supporters group was the Crocketteers. This group was in existence for 18 months prior to the team's announcement, and was instrumental in helping consolidate the San Antonio soccer fanbase behind the new team. The group currently has over 1,500 registered members.
 The Casual Football Firm (C.F.F.) began in 2011 with the announcement of the new NASL team, the San Antonio Scorpions.  Upon their inception they were known as the Bexar County Casuals. As their chapters grew to other cities, they have since come under one umbrella. The C.F.F. are known for their high energetic chants and hardcore footie style. C.F.F can be found standing for 90 minutes for their club chanting mostly original songs of pride.
 El Veneno was "San Antonio's first Spanish-speaking supporters group". Their chants were in Spanish.

Mascot 

On April 12, 2014, San Antonio unveiled its new mascot at a home match against Minnesota United. During halftime, the new mascot was introduced to fans and supporters. The club held a naming contest with the fans on social media and after an online vote, Sting was the name given to the new mascot. Sting attended all home games at Toyota Field and could be seen alongside the team at marketing and community outreach programs.

Rivalries 

The Scorpions played MLS side FC Dallas in the deeproot Funds Cup, an annual rivalry game between the two clubs. The team also played in the Hill Country Derby versus the USL's Austin Aztex. This game gave "Central Texas bragging rights" to the winner.

Broadcasting 

For the 2015 season, "all 15 regular season home matches will air live on ESPN3 in the U.S., ESPN Play in Latin America, and ESPN Player in Europe, the Middle East and Africa." In total reached 75 countries. All home games were also broadcast locally on KSAT-TV Channel 12.

Major League Soccer expansion 

The Scorpions had declared their interest in moving to Major League Soccer. Toyota Field is expandable to MLS standards of 18,000 seats, although the stadium's location 20 minutes northeast of downtown does not meet MLS's preference for downtown stadiums. Owner Gordon Hartmann had preliminary discussions with MLS CEO Don Garber in spring 2014. The Crocketeers supporters group have collected over 5,000 signatures in a petition to join MLS. As of January 2015, San Antonio is still in discussions with MLS and "has been very active" according to Commissioner Garber. On February 26, 2015, the San Antonio City Council, Scorpions owner Gordon Hartman, and MLS Commissioner Don Garber all received a letter from the president of the Mexican Football Federation, Justino Compeán, stating he and the Federation support Gordon Hartman on his bid to bring MLS to San Antonio. Compeán wrote that "The city has the infrastructure, resources and diversity that makes San Antonio the ideal place for MLS expansion...I am very pleased that these local leaders have initiated the effort to bring professional soccer to San Antonio and I look forward to having them as my partner.”

Year-by-year 

# Spring & Fall Championships not instituted until 2013 season

Record vs. NASL clubs 

$ Dissolved after the 2012 season

Record vs. MLS clubs

Record vs. international clubs

Honors

League 

 North American Soccer League
 Champions: 2014
 Spring Champions:
 Fall Champions: 2014
 North American Supporters' Trophy: 2012
 Runner-Up: 2014

Minor 

 Deeproot Funds Cup: 2014, 2015
 Hill Country Derby:

* denotes co-champions

Player honors

Records

Player records 
Statistics are for NASL regular season and post season only.

All-time leaders

Hat tricks 
4 Player scored 4 goals.

Records 
Most goals in a regular season: 20 |  Pablo Campos (2012)
Most assists in a regular season: 8 |  Billy Forbes (2015)
Most consecutive appearances: 42 |  Billy Forbes (May 31, 2014 – September 5, 2015)

Team records 
The following records are for NASL regular season only. As of September 9, 2015

Attendance 
Highest NASL attendance: 13,151 on April 15, 2012 (0–4 vs Puerto Rico Islanders), Heroes Stadium
Record NASL attendance at Toyota Field is 8,313 on September 20, 2014 (0–2 vs Minnesota United)
Lowest NASL attendance: 4,192 on September 9, 2015 (3–3 vs Carolina Railhawks), Toyota Field
Highest U.S. Open Cup attendance: 7,164 on May 29, 2012 (1–0 vs Houston Dynamo), Heroes Stadium
Lowest U.S. Open Cup attendance: 3,411 on May 28, 2014 (4–2 vs NTX Rayados), Toyota Field

Matches 
Biggest win: 8–0 vs Carolina Railhawks, July 28, 2012
Biggest loss: 0–4 vs Puerto Rico Islanders, April 15, 2012 | 0–4 vs FC Edmonton, July 5, 2015
Highest scoring match: 4–7 loss vs Tampa Bay Rowdies, August 3, 2013

Seasons 
Most wins in a NASL season: 16 in 27 matches, 2014
Most losses in a NASL season: 14 in 26 matches, 2013
Most points in a NASL season: 52 in 27 matches, 2014
Fewest points in a NASL season: 30 in 26 matches, 2013
Most goals scored in a NASL season: 46 in 28 matches, 2012
Fewest goals scored in a NASL season: 34 in 26 matches, 2013

Streaks 
Longest winning streak: 5 games, June 1 – July 4, 2013
Longest unbeaten streak: 9 games, April 21 – June 16, 2012 | May 10 – July 26, 2014
Longest losing streak: 5 games, August 3 – 31, 2013
Longest winless streak: 7 games, August 3 – September 14, 2013

See also 
San Antonio Thunder of the North American Soccer League (1968–84)

References

External links 

 

 
Sports teams in San Antonio
Soccer clubs in Texas
Association football clubs established in 2010
North American Soccer League teams
2010 establishments in Texas
2015 disestablishments in Texas
Association football clubs disestablished in 2015